Hawthorne House may refer to:

in New Zealand
Hawthorne House (Hawke's Bay, New Zealand), Edwardian Luxury Bed and Breakfast in Hawke's Bay, New Zealand

in the United States
Hawthorne (Prairieville, Alabama)
Hawthorne-Cowart House, Greenville, Alabama, listed on the National Register of Historic Places
Hawthorne House (Pine Apple, Alabama), also known as Col. J.R. Hawthorne House
Nathaniel Hawthorne Boyhood Home, South Casco, Maine
Hawthorne Place, Natchez, Mississippi, listed on the National Register of Historic Places
Rachel Louise Hawthorne House, Portland, Oregon
Hawthorne Hall, Fincastle, Virginia

See also
Hawthorn House (disambiguation)
Hawthorne (disambiguation)
Hawthorne Historic District, Huntington, West Virginia, listed on the NRHP in Cabell County, West Virginia